Pleasant Valley is a city in Clay County, Missouri, United States. The population was 2,743 at the 2020 census. It is part of the Kansas City metropolitan area.

Geography
Pleasant Valley is located approximately four miles north of the Missouri River and just north of the I-35-I-435 interchange.

Demographics

2010 census
As of the census of 2010, there were 2,961 people, 1,195 households, and 772 families living in the city. The racial makeup of the city was 89.6% White, 4.6% African American, 0.5% Native American, 0.3% Asian, 1.0% Pacific Islander, 1.2% from other races, and 2.7% from two or more races. Hispanic or Latino of any race were 4.7% of the population.

There were 1,195 households, of which 30.6% had children under the age of 18 living with them, 45.6% were married couples living together, 14.2% had a female householder with no husband present, 4.8% had a male householder with no wife present, and 35.4% were non-families. 28.4% of all households were made up of individuals, and 8.5% had someone living alone who was 65 years of age or older. The average household size was 2.40 and the average family size was 2.94.

The median age in the city was 39.9 years. 22.4% of residents were under the age of 18; 7.7% were between the ages of 18 and 24; 27.1% were from 25 to 44; 27.9% were from 45 to 64; and 14.9% were 65 years of age or older. The gender makeup of the city was 47.4% male and 52.6% female.

2000 census
As of the census of 2000, there were 3,321 people, 1,328 households, and 873 families living in the city. The racial makeup of the city was 94.07% White, 2.20% African American, 0.75% Native American, 0.60% Asian, 0.75% from other races, and 1.63% from two or more races. Hispanic or Latino of any race were 2.95% of the population.

There were 1,328 households, out of which 32.8% had children under the age of 18 living with them, 48.1% were married couples living together, 12.0% had a female householder with no husband present, and 34.2% were non-families. 26.5% of all households were made up of individuals, and 6.9% had someone living alone who was 65 years of age or older. The average household size was 2.42 and the average family size was 2.92.

In the city, the population was spread out, with 24.2% under the age of 18, 8.4% from 18 to 24, 34.3% from 25 to 44, 21.6% from 45 to 64, and 11.4% who were 65 years of age or older. The median age was 36 years. For every 100 females, there were 94.1 males. For every 100 females age 18 and over, there were 88.2 males.

The median income for a household in the city was $48,684, and the median income for a family was $54,891. Males had a median income of $38,839 versus $25,386 for females. The per capita income for the city was $26,084. About 3.9% of families and 4.6% of the population were below the poverty line, including 6.0% of those under age 18 and 9.9% of those age 65 or over.

Education
Pleasant Valley is served by the North Kansas City School District 74. Pleasant Valley Early Childhood Education Center is in the community. Pleasant Valley is zoned to Gracemor Elementary School, Maple Park Middle School, and Winnetonka High School.

References

Kansas City metropolitan area
Cities in Clay County, Missouri
Cities in Missouri